There's Life in the Old Dog Yet is an album by Ronnie Drew, released in 2006.

Produced by Phil Coulter, who wrote the title track, Drew recorded this album of songs about growing old shortly before being diagnosed with throat cancer in 2006, an irony which was commented on a few months later by both men on The Late Late Show. The album contains many oldies
or standards, with the predominant theme of the album being old age and death.  Even the traditionally upbeat singalong "The Wild Rover" has been transformed here into a lament. Whereas in the traditional version, the singer is saying he "will play the wild rover no more", this is his own choice; but in the version here, the reason is thar he is no longer able.
Not all the songs are downbeat and mournful. The title track is optimistic and "Wait Till The Clouds Roll By" is optimistic also: "Jenny, we'll be together / Just wait 'til the clouds roll by."

Track listing
"There's Life in the Old Dog Yet"
"September Song"
"If I Had My Life to Live Over"
"The Wild Rover"
"Macushla"
"It Was A Very Good Year"
"A Pint of Plain"
"Irene Goodnight"
"The Old House"
"Wait Till The Clouds Roll By"
"Love's Old Sweet Song"
"Hard TImes"

2006 albums
Ronnie Drew albums
Albums produced by Phil Coulter